The Guáitara Fault is a dextral strike-slip fault in the department of Nariño in southwestern Colombia.

Etymology 
The fault is named after the Guáitara River in Nariño.

Description 
The Guáitara Fault is in the Nariño Department of southwestern Colombia, crossing the Western Ranges of the Colombian Andes and to the south of the city of Pasto. The fault offsets Neogene volcanic rocks. The fault is believed to extend south into the Republic of Ecuador and may be part of the megaregional Romeral Fault System. The fault forms well-developed deep V-shaped valleys, linear topographic features, fault-controlled drainage, deflected streams, and elongated hills.

See also 

 List of earthquakes in Colombia
 Piedrancha Fault
 Romeral Fault System

References

Bibliography

Maps 
 

Seismic faults of Colombia
Strike-slip faults
Inactive faults
Faults